Montbéliard – Courcelles Aerodrome  is an airport serving Montbéliard, a commune in the Doubs department in the Franche-Comté region in eastern France.

Facilities
It also has a parallel grass runway which measures .

References

External links
  Aéroclub du Pays de Montbéliard
  Club de parachutisme de Montbéliard
  Aérodrome de Montbéliard - Courcelles at Union des Aéroports Français

Airports in Bourgogne-Franche-Comté
Buildings and structures in Doubs
Airports established in 1933
Montbéliard